Aleksandr Nikolayevich Razumov (born 12 November 1980) is a former Russian professional football player.

Club career
He played in the Russian Football National League for FC Ural Yekaterinburg in 2003.

References

1980 births
Footballers from Voronezh
Living people
Russian footballers
Association football defenders
FC Ural Yekaterinburg players